The following is a list of films about ice hockey

See also
 List of sports films
 List of highest-grossing sports films

Ice hockey films
Ice hockey
Films